Prof John George Adami  (12 January 1862 – 29 August 1926) was an English pathologist. He was the head of the pathological department of the Royal Victoria Hospital. From 1892, he was professor of pathology in McGill University, Montreal, Canada. During World War I, he was accorded a temporary commission in the Canadian Army Medical Corps to serve as the official historian for the medical branch. Starting in 1919, he was the Vice-Chancellor of the University of Liverpool.

Life
He was born in the Ashton upon Mersey district of south Manchester, England, the son of John George Adami, a local hotel proprietor, and his wife, Sarah Ann Ellis Leech.

He was educated at Manchester Grammar School, Owens College in Manchester and then studied Medicine at Christ's College, Cambridge, with postgraduate study in both Breslau (then in Germany, now part of Poland) and Paris. He took distinguished honours at Cambridge in natural science, was Darwin prizeman in 1885, M.R.C.S., and was appointed demonstrator of physiology at Cambridge University in 1887.

In 1888, he exposed himself to rabies, and published an account of his treatment at the Pasteur Institute's vaccination clinic.
Elected fellow of Jesus College, Cambridge in 1891, he soon afterwards became head of the pathological department of the Royal Victoria Hospital.
From 1892, he was Professor of Pathology in McGill University, Canada.

During World War I he held a temporary commission in the Canadian Army Medical Corps and served on the staff of the overseas Director General Medical Services, London. His principal role was as Assistant Medical Director in charge of statistics and returns. He was also appointed Medical Historical Recorder, and in this capacity charged with compiling a contemporary account of the Canadian medical service during the war, the first volume of which was published in 1918 as The War Story of the Canadian Army Medical Corps, Vol. 1.  The remainder of his work on this subject remains unpublished. His wartime diary is held at the Welcome Library. From 1919, he was Vice-Chancellor of University of Liverpool.

He was the author of numerous monographs upon subjects relating to pathology in French, German, English and American medical journals, and of many papers read before medical societies. He was elected a Fellow of the Royal Society of Edinburgh in 1898, His proposers were John Batty Tuke, Diarmid Noel Paton,  Thomas Richard Fraser and David Berry Hart. He was elected a Fellow of the Royal Society of Canada in 1902 and a Fellow of the Royal Society on 11 May 1905.

He died in Liverpool in 1926 and is buried there in Allerton Cemetery.

Family
He married Mary Stuart Cantlie in 1894 in Montreal.  They had three children, of whom 2 survived.  Widowed in 1916, he married in 1922 in Liverpool Marie Wilkinson, who outlived him.

Legacy
In the present day the term lepidic defines the proliferation of tumor cells along the surface of intact alveolar walls without stromal or vascular invasion.

Works

Honours and awards
 1898: Fellow of the Royal Society of Edinburgh
 1905: Fellow of the Royal Society of London
 1914: Fothergillian prize of the London Medical Society
 1917: Croonian Lecture at the Royal College of Physicians
 1919: awarded CBE
 1921: 1st David Lloyd Roberts Lecture at Manchester Royal Infirmary Charles White of Manchester (1728-1813) and the arrest of puerperal fever

References

External links
 Adami, John George (1862-1926), pathologist, NRA 13214: National Archives
 "John George Adami", Walter Stoneman, National Portrait Gallery
"Mrs. J. G. Adami and children on horseback", Windermere area, British Columbia, Glenbow Museum
 

1862 births
1926 deaths
People from Sale, Greater Manchester
Alumni of Christ's College, Cambridge
Fellows of Jesus College, Cambridge
British pathologists
Fellows of the Royal Society of Edinburgh
Fellows of the Royal Society
Academic staff of McGill University
Vice-Chancellors of the University of Liverpool